Sebaceous hyperplasia is a disorder of the sebaceous glands in which they become enlarged, producing flesh-colored or yellowish, shiny, often umbilicated bumps on the face. Newly formed nodules often swell with sweating (which is pathognomonic for the condition), but this diminishes over time.

Sebaceous glands are glands located within the skin and are responsible for secreting an oily substance named sebum. They are commonly associated with hair follicles but they can be found in hairless regions of the skin as well. Their secretion lubricates the skin, protecting it from drying out or becoming irritated.

Sebaceous hyperplasia generally affects newborns as well as middle-aged to elderly adults. The symptoms of this condition are 1–5 mm papules on the skin, mainly on the forehead, nose and cheeks, and seborrheic facial skin. The papules may be cauliflower-shaped. In infants, acne is sometimes associated with sebaceous hyperplasia.

See also 
 Sebaceous adenoma
 Sebaceous carcinoma
 Skin lesion

References

External links 

Epidermal nevi, neoplasms, and cysts